RIQ may refer to:

 Rassemblement pour l'indépendance du Québec
 Richard Tupper Atwater (1892-1948), American author

See also
 Riq
 Rick (disambiguation)